Sindy Noelia Ramírez Acosta (born 28 January 1991) is a Uruguayan footballer and a futsal player who plays as a forward and a pivot for Argentine club San Lorenzo de Almagro (both football and futsal sides) and the Uruguay women's national football team.

International career
Ramírez played for Uruguay in the 2018 Copa América Femenina.

International goals
Scores and results list Uruguay's goal tally first

References 

1991 births
Living people
Women's association football forwards
Uruguayan women's footballers
People from Canelones Department
Uruguay women's international footballers
Pan American Games competitors for Uruguay
Footballers at the 2007 Pan American Games
San Lorenzo de Almagro footballers
Uruguayan expatriate women's footballers
Uruguayan expatriate sportspeople in Argentina
Expatriate women's footballers in Argentina
Futsal forwards
Uruguayan women's futsal players